The Orphan Master's Son is a 2012 novel by American author Adam Johnson. It deals with intertwined themes of propaganda, identity, and state power in North Korea. The novel was awarded the 2013 Pulitzer Prize for Fiction.

Characters
Pak Jun Do: Protagonist – An orphan and model citizen who struggles through life in North Korea.
Commander Ga: A North Korean hero and rival of Kim Jong-il.
Sun Moon: Ga's wife and famous North Korean actress.
Kim Jong-il (the Dear Leader): North Korean dictator.
Interrogator for the North Korean state
Comrade Buc: An official in the North Korean government. He helps Commander Ga through some of his journey.
Mongnan: An old woman who befriends and helps Pak Jun Do through a challenging time in his life.

Plot

Part 1: The Biography of Jun Do
Pak Jun Do is raised in a North Korean state orphanage, serving as leader and decision-maker to the other children but always deferring to his father, the orphanage's master.  When he is fourteen the children are conscripted into military service, often sent to fight in underground tunnels because, as orphans, they are considered low-class citizens and expendable. Jun Do becomes a proficient fighter and is eventually conscripted as a kidnapper of Japanese citizens. Despite occasional feelings of guilt, particularly when a Japanese woman accidentally dies during an abduction, Jun Do never questions his work and follows every order; as a reward, he is taught to speak and read English, greatly increasing his value as a citizen.  

Following his military service he is made a signal operator on a fishing boat, intercepting and translating radio transmissions. He grows fond of his fellow crew members and fascinated with everything he hears, particularly two American girls who are attempting to row across the Pacific Ocean. However, transmissions from the International Space Station cause both him and the boat's second mate to realize that much of what their leaders have told them about the outside world is a lie. When the second mate becomes disillusioned and defects, the rest of the crew concocts a dramatic cover story which includes Jun Do being bitten and nearly killed by a shark. After being brutally interrogated upon returning, Jun Do is declared a national hero for the alleged incident.

Due to his newfound fame, he is made part of a diplomatic delegation traveling to America, attempting to recover technology North Korea claims the Americans have stolen (it is later revealed the North Koreans themselves stole it from the Japanese before the Americans intercepted and confiscated it). Jun Do becomes acquainted with a Texas senator and Wanda, a government agent who appears sympathetic and provides him with a means of covertly contacting her. The negotiations break down when the senator, who assumes Jun Do is the true leader of the group masquerading as a figurehead, is angered by the subterfuge and refuses to meet any of their demands. Upon returning to North Korea, Jun Do and the other delegates are tricked into entering a prison mine as punishment for their failure, whereupon they "cease to officially exist."

Part 2: The Confessions of Commander Ga
An unnamed interrogator for the North Korean state has been tasked with investigating national hero Commander Ga Chol Chun, who has been arrested for killing his wife, the famous actress Sun Moon, and their children. The interrogator, who compiles biographies of prisoners as a by-product of interrogation, is intrigued by Ga, who refuses to talk and is seemingly able to withstand any form of torture. Through his own investigations and persistent conversation, the interrogator is able to slowly learn Ga's story.

It transpires that "Ga" is actually Jun Do, who killed the real Ga during a confrontation in the prison mine. Ga had been a political rival to the Dear Leader, Kim Jong-il, who also covets Sun Moon; as such, Jun Do's assumption of Ga's identity goes largely ignored and he is made the "replacement husband" of Sun Moon. At first, Sun Moon forces him to live in the dirt cellar under the house but slowly accepts him as her "husband" and her children's "father." Having been enamored with the image of Sun Moon for years, Jun Do is initially disgusted by the actual woman, who is self-absorbed and disdainful of the common people. Gradually he comes to understand that she has resigned herself to a life almost completely controlled by the Dear Leader; he has sabotaged her film career in retaliation for deflecting his advances. She also lived in fear of the real Ga; the novel suggests that he was a brutal sadist who only married her to spite Kim. Jun Do often questions her acting career and loyalty to North Korea; though she is devoted to acting, her faith in North Korea is less resolute, intertwined with her growing contempt for the Dear Leader. After watching Casablanca, she realizes how much of her life has been spent making propaganda with little of the artistic value she prizes, and makes "Ga" promise to help her and the children escape with him.

The Dear Leader reveals to "Commander Ga" that he has captured one of the American rower girls and plans to use her as a bargaining chip to recover the confiscated Japanese technology, with which they intend to bolster their development of nuclear power. However, he admits to being enamored with his captive. He forces her to translate his various works into English, and intends to humiliate the Americans by taking the technology while refusing to return the girl. As the Texas senator previously indicated he would only negotiate with Ga, there is also the implication Kim will have "Ga" killed once the negotiation succeeds, so he can have Sun Moon for himself. Sensing an opportunity, Jun Do contacts Wanda and begins to plan.

An American delegation which includes the Texas senator and Wanda arrives in Pyongyang to retrieve the rower girl. To show off, the Dear Leader stages an elaborate performance  which includes Sun Moon. While the Dear Leader is distracted by the delegation, Jun Do smuggles Sun Moon and the children aboard the American aircraft, allowing himself to be captured to ensure their escape. The Dear Leader, dumbfounded that "Ga" has given his own life "just to spoil mine," has him arrested and sentenced to death. The interrogator, determined to write a factual account of Commander Ga's life, realizes his efforts are futile when his parents, who have devoted themselves to the state out of fear, point out that an "official" version has already been broadcast. Realizing the interrogation, ostensibly to force "Ga" to confess to killing Sun Moon, is really an attempt to find her and that "Ga" will be killed regardless, the interrogator attempts to brainwash "Ga" and himself at the same time using a device similar to electroshock therapy; however, Ga takes control of the machine and uses it to commit suicide. The novel ends with the "official" version of Sun Moon's escape, which depicts "Ga" dying in a fantastical attempt to save her from being kidnapped by the Americans and proclaims him a martyr, to be revered forever.

Structure and style
Johnson has said that this book began as a short story called The Best North Korean Short Story of 2005.
There are three narrators in the book: a third-person account; the propaganda version of Commander Ga and Sun Moon's story, which is projected across the country by loudspeakers; and a first-person account by an interrogator seeking to write a Biography of Commander Ga.

Critical reception
The novel's reception was highly favorable. Michiko Kakutani, writing in The New York Times, called it "a daring and remarkable novel, a novel that not only opens a frightening window on the mysterious kingdom of North Korea, but one that also excavates the very meaning of love and sacrifice." Writing in the Wall Street Journal, Sam Sacks  said “stylistic panache, technical daring, moral weight and an uncanny sense of the current moment—combine in Adam Johnson's 'The Orphan Master's Son', the single best work of fiction published in 2012.” M. Francis Wolff, in her review for The New Inquiry, called the book "one of those rare works of high ambition that follow through on all of its promises... it examines both the Orwellian horrors of life in the DPRK and the voyeurism of Western media." David Ignatius’ review in The Washington Post called the novel “an audacious act of imagination.” In the New York Times, Christopher R. Beha called it “an ingeniously plotted adventure that feels much shorter than its roughly 450 pages and offers the reader a tremendous amount of fun,” but complained that the “[propaganda] interludes are fine exercises in dark wit, but in the context of a novel that seeks to portray a country’s suffering, they’re unconvincing.” On April 15, 2013, the novel won the Pulitzer Prize for Fiction.

Awards and honors
2012 National Book Critics Circle Award, finalist
2013 The Morning News Tournament of Books, winner
2013 Pulitzer Prize for Fiction, winner
2013 Dayton Literary Peace Prize, winner fiction
2013 ALA Notable lists American Library Association Notable Book Award.
2013 California Book Award, gold medal

References

External links

 PBS NewsHour interview with Adam Johnson
 NPR interview with Adam Johnson
 The Guardian review

2012 American novels
Novels set in North Korea
Novels about propaganda
Pulitzer Prize for Fiction-winning works
Random House books
English-language books